Demu may refer to:

Dému, a village in France
Demǔ 地母, "Mother Earth", Chinese goddess
Diesel electric multiple unit (DEMU)
The alien antagonists of The Demu Trilogy by F.M. Busby
Demu, used in East Africa to refer to a woman